Super Animal Royale is an indie battle royale video game developed by Pixile Studios and published by Modus Games. The game features 64-player matches starring anthropomorphic animals who use a variety of weapons and firearms from a 2D overhead perspective and was built using the Unity game engine. An early version debuted on Steam Early Access on December 12, 2018, with a free-to-play demo version released the following month in January 2019. An Xbox One and Xbox Series X/S version appeared on Xbox Game Pass in game preview on June 1, 2021. The game left early access on Steam and was released for macOS, Microsoft Windows, Nintendo Switch, PlayStation 4, PlayStation 5, Xbox One and Xbox Series X/S on August 26, 2021, and for Google Stadia on December 14, 2021.

Gameplay
Super Animal Royale is a 2D, top-down, third-person battle royale shooter where up to 64 players compete to be the last person standing using a variety of weapons. Players create a character from one of several "Super Animals", including different breeds and colors of various species, which are unlocked by collecting animal DNA awarded after each match. Experience points are granted based on the player's performance at the end of each game, which allow them to level up and gain access to new potential species. Cosmetic items can also be obtained that can be used to customize an animal's appearance such as shirts, hats, mustaches, and glasses.

After joining a lobby, players mingle in a non-combat area until the match begins, with non-player bots joining the queue if less than 64 human players are present a few seconds before the start of the game. Each combatant parachutes from a large eagle onto a battlefield containing weapons, protective armor, and Health Juice which can be stocked to restore health when needed. Initially wielding a katana, players can find automatic and semi-automatic guns and ammunition along with grenades used to defeat other players. Hamster balls can also be entered for protection as well as running over opponents. Super skunk gas will creep in from the outer edges of the map as the match progresses, forcing players into progressively smaller areas until the end of the game. Each game can be joined solo, as a duo, or as a squad.

Development
Super Animal Royale began development in October 2017 by members of Pixile Studios. The game was inspired by similar shooter games such as H1Z1 and PlayerUnknown's Battlegrounds, with its 2D aesthetic taken from "classic top-down adventure games." Lead designer Michael Silverwood and lead developer Chris Clogg built the game in Unity, and created the line-of-sight mechanic of hiding players in object's shadows by modifying an existing Unity plugin to aid with performance. Silverwood stated that his decision to have the game feature cartoon animals was that he liked the absurd humor of juxtaposing whimsical, colorful characters with surprisingly angry and violent personalities.

Sign-ups for the alpha version began in March 2018, where players could register on the title's official website. A later version of the title was released on Steam Early Access on December 12, 2018, which launched with a "Free Weekend" promotion for the following four days. On January 3, 2019, a permanent free-to-play demo version was released which allows players to transfer their progress and unlocked content to the full, paid version of the game when purchased.

Reception 

As of May 2022, Super Animal Royale has 30,000 reviews on Steam, with 92% of the reviews being positive.

References

External links
 Official website
 Developer website

2021 video games
Battle royale games
Early access video games
Indie video games
MacOS games
Nintendo Switch games
PlayStation 4 games
PlayStation 5 games
Stadia games
Third-person shooters
Video games about animals
Video games developed in Canada
Windows games
Xbox One games
Xbox Series X and Series S games
Multiplayer and single-player video games